Little Kentucky may refer to:

Little, Kentucky, an unincorporated community in Breathitt County, Kentucky
Little Kentucky River, a tributary of the Ohio River